The City of Greater Shepparton is a local government area in the Hume region of Victoria, Australia, located in the north-east part of the state. It includes the city of Shepparton and the towns of Arcadia, Ardmona, Congupna, Dookie, Grahamvale, Kialla, Lemnos, Merrigum, Mooroopna, Murchison, Tallygaroopna, Tatura, Toolamba and Undera. It was formed in 1994 from the amalgamation of the City of Shepparton, Shire of Shepparton, and parts of the Shire of Rodney, Shire of Euroa, Shire of Goulburn, Shire of Tungamah, Shire of Violet Town and Shire of Waranga.

The City is governed and administered by the Greater Shepparton City Council; its seat of local government and administrative centre is located at the council headquarters in Shepparton, it also has a service centre located in Tatura. The City is named after the main urban settlement located in the centre of the LGA, that is Shepparton, which together with adjoining Mooroopna form the LGA's most populous urban area with a population of 51,903.

Council

Current composition
The council is composed of nine councillors elected to represent an unsubdivided municipality.
The last council election was in 2020. The elected councillors of Greater Shepparton in 2022 are:

Administration and governance
The council meets in the council chambers at the council headquarters in the Shepparton Municipal Offices, which is also the location of the council's administrative activities. It also provides customer services at both its administrative centre in Shepparton, and its service centre in Tatura.

Townships and localities
The 2021 census, the city had a population of 68,409 up from 63,837 in the 2016 census

^ - Territory divided with another LGA
* - Not noted in 2016 Census
# - Not noted in 2021 Census

See also
 List of localities (Victoria)
 List of places on the Victorian Heritage Register in the City of Greater Shepparton

References

External links

Greater Shepparton City Council official website
Metlink local public transport map
Link to Land Victoria interactive maps

Local government areas of Victoria (Australia)
Hume (region)